Extra-Capsular Extraction is the first official release by the drone doom band Earth. Despite the length, it is an EP release. The 12" release puts both tracks of "A Bureaucratic Desire for Revenge" together.

Track listing

Personnel
Dave Harwell - bass guitar
Dylan Carlson - guitar, vocals
Joe Preston - bass guitar, percussion
Guests: Kelly Canary and Kurt Cobain - vocals on "A Bureaucratic Desire for Revenge, Part 2" (and also on "Divine and Bright", included on the 2010 Southern Lord re-issue)

References

1991 EPs
Earth (American band) albums
Sub Pop EPs